Paul Peart (also known as Paul Peart-Smith) is a British comics artist who has done some work for 2000 AD, Nelson, H.P Lovecraft, and many other publications.

Bibliography

Judge Hershey: "Down Time" (with Dave Stone, in Judge Dredd Megazine #2.09 1992)
Slaughterbowl (with John Smith, in 2000 AD #842-849, 1993) 
Judge Dredd:
 "Do the Wrong Thing" (with Gordon Rennie, in Judge Dredd Megazine #2.49 1994)
 "Under Siege" (with Mark Millar, in 2000 AD #880, 1994)
 "Dredd Has Been Murdered" (with Alan McKenzie 2000AD Sci-Fi Special 1995, 1995)
 "Sponts A-Go-Go" (with Chris Standley and Roger Langridge, Judge Dredd Lawman of the Future #14, 1996)
 "Medusa" (with Alan Barnes and Roger Langridge, Judge Dredd Lawman of the Future #19-20, 1996)
 "Control" (with Robbie Morrison, in Judge Dredd Megazine #3.18 1996)
Harke & Burr: "Secret Origin" (with Si Spencer, in Judge Dredd Megazine #2.83 1995)
Tharg's Future Shocks: "Brush With Fate" (with Win Wiacek, in 2000 AD #949, 1995)
Tracer (with Dave Stone, in 2000 AD #948-949, 1995) 
"Horrible History" comic book artist/cartoonist, published by Eaglemoss 2003 -2005
 "Jackie Chan Adventures" illustrator, published by Eaglemoss 2003-2005
"Horrible Science" comic book artist/cartoonist, published by Eaglemoss  2002 -2006
"Wallace and Gromit"  comic published by Titan 2006 - 2007
"One Plus One" written and drawn by Paul Peart Smith, published online as a web comic on  the  Activate  website, http://www.activatecomix.com, 2009 - 2010
"Black Power" a history of black comics exhibition at the Swiss Cottage Gallery, London, 2010. Curated by Paul Peart Smith and George Nelson.
"1979"  in "Nelson" published by Blank Slate in 2011, coloured by Rob Davis, edited by Woodrow Phoenix and Rob Davis.
"Erotic Fantasy Now" edited by Paul Peart Smith, published by Ilex, 2011
"He" in "H.P Lovecraft Anthology 2 "published by Self Made Hero in 2012, written by Dwight L. Macpherson
Design Manager for Home Fundraising Ltd. 
"Edge of Extinction" Comics Artist, published by Eighth Continent, written by Baden Mellonie
Lead Animation Background Artist on "Fanshaw and Crudnut" for Blue Rocket Productions, appearing on Australian Channel 9 and GOtv. 2015-2016
"Graveyard Song" self published, 2016
Lead Background Artist on Bikey Face an Animated short.
Comics Artist on Edge Of Extinction 2, Cast No Shadow Exhibition, Cover illustrator for Freedom City Comics, Self published A-OK manga style comic.

Notes

References

Paul Peart at Barney

External links

Older blog
Paul Peart at Act-i-vate

Year of birth missing (living people)
Place of birth missing (living people)
Living people
British comics artists